Strano appuntamento is a 1951 Italian film directed by Dezsö Ákos Hamza.

Cast
Umberto Spadaro	... 	Rossi
Leda Gloria	... 	Signora Rossi
Rossana Podestà	... 	Their daughter
Enzo Staiola	... 	Older son (as Enzo Stajola)
Stefano Guarnieri	... 	Younger son
Marina Bonfigli
Clelia Matania
Olga Solbelli
Gianni Musy		(as Gianni Glori)
Enrico Glori
Carlo Romano
Gianna Pacetti
Clara Auteri Pepe
Zoe Incrocci
Oscar Andriani

External links
 

1951 films
1950s Italian-language films
Italian comedy films
1951 comedy films
Italian black-and-white films
1950s Italian films